Toveyleh-ye Kuchek (also Romanized as Ţoveyleh-ye Kūchek, Ţoveyleh-ye Kūchak, Tavilehé Koochak, Ţavīleh Kūchek, Ţavīleh-ye Kūchak, and Ţavīleh-ye Kūchek; also known as Ţavīleh-ye Ma‘ārej and Loveyleh-ye Kūchek) is a village in Gheyzaniyeh Rural District, in the Central District of Ahvaz County, Khuzestan Province, Iran. At the 2006 census, its population was 209, in 37 families.

References 

Populated places in Ahvaz County